Jacqueline Smith (born 20 February 1971) is a Norwegian trade unionist.

Born in Wyoming, United States to a Vietnamese American mother and a Norwegian father, she moved to Norway, first to Stavanger at the age of 8, and later to Asker. She studied law, but left the university to become a croupier for Color Line. She was elected President of the Norwegian Seafarers' Union (NSU) by the union congress in 2006 and re-elected in 2010. She is the Union's first female president, and the youngest ever when first elected in 2006.

Smith did not stand for re-election in 2014. After leaving the NSU, she continued her trade union work internationally by assuming the office of Maritime Coordinator of the International Transport Workers' Federation (ITF) Head Office in London.

Links
 Jacqueline Smith on the ITF pages

References

1971 births
Living people
American emigrants to Norway
American people of Norwegian descent
American people of Vietnamese descent
Norwegian trade unionists
Norwegian people of American descent
People from Wyoming